Hameshaa (English: 'Forever') is a 1997 Indian Hindi-language romance film written by Ranbir Pushp and directed by Sanjay Gupta. The film stars Aditya Pancholi, Saif Ali Khan and Kajol. Aruna Irani and Kader Khan have supporting roles in the film. The film explores reincarnation and marks Sanjay Gupta's third collaboration with Aditya Pancholi.

Plot 

Raja and Yash Vardhan are childhood friends. Though they come from different backgrounds, Raja being middle class and Yash being wealthy, they treat each other as brothers and engage in the odd off-road racing challenge. Rani Sharma - daughter of a local doctor enters their lives. Raja bumps into Rani at his college and falls in love with her instantly. Rani hesitates at first, but Raja's charms start working their magic on her. Raja calls her to a precarious cliff to profess his love to her. It's a rainy day and Rani gets caught in a storm. Yash happens to be driving past her when she asks him for a ride to the cliff. Yash is instantly smitten by Rani. After some casual flirting with her in the car, he drops her off and she rushes to meet Raja to find out why he called her there. Raja confesses his love to her and she brushes him off. Raja feels snubbed and in order to prove his love for her, he attempts to kill himself while trying to walk off the edge off the cliff backwards to see her reaction. Rani sees his willingness to so easily give his life for her and comes to the realization that his love must indeed be true. After preventing Raja from falling off the cliff at the last minute, they profess their feelings for each other and their love deepens. However Yash, secretly sees them together and is shocked. Jealous and bitter, Yash proceeds to meet Raja under the guise of wanting to introduce the love of his life to his best friend. Raja shows up and Yash looks visibly disturbed. While trying to cheer up Yash, Raja casually holds Yash's hand and leans backwards from very same cliff ledge and tells him that he loves his friend and trusts him. Yash takes the opportunity and tragically kills a stunned Raja by leaving Raja's hand at the last minute and Raja falls to his death. Rani witnesses the murder and tells Yash that they will be together again and he will not be able to do anything. She jumps to her death with intent, leaving Yash heartbroken.

Many years have passed and Yash is unmarried and lives with his Dai Ma. Fate brings him to Reshma - a folk dancer (also played by  Kajol) who looks like Rani. Promising to fund her father's medical cure and telling her that he will support her talent, Yash brings them over to his palace. Soon thereafter, Yash discovers Raju (also played by  Saif Ali Khan) who looks like Raja and is shocked. Yash continues to look after Reshma and tries to win her heart, but she encounters Raju and remembers incidents of her past life. After several other encounters with him, she remembers what happened in her past life, but Raju does not remember a thing. Yash wishes to marry Reshma and does whatever he can to make Raju leave. He even tries to bribe Raju by asking him to pursue his music career in Mumbai. Reshma confronts Yash when she finds out that he secretly arranged to get engaged to her without her consent. She further discovers Yash's deceit through her dreams about Raja's murder from her past life. Unable to bear it and tortured by the truth, Reshma escapes to Raju and tells him what happened. He swiftly returns her to Yash thinking that she is mentally unsound. But when she escapes once again on the day of her wedding with Yash with photos to prove her theory, Raju remembers everything and jumps onto a train with Reshma. They barely manage to escape Yash, who murders Reshma's father, kills Raju's best friend and even tosses Raju's  uncle in front of a train in his murderous rampage. Raju is now determined to make sure that Reshma stays with him only. In a car chase that ensues, they reach the same point where they had originally died. After fighting each other and trading punches, Raju is once again hanging on to Yash's hand, ready to die just like he did earlier, but reverses it by distracting Yash. Now Yash is hanging on for dear life and Raju lets go, killing Yash and thus avenging his death. Raju and Reshma finally unite.

Cast 
Aditya Pancholi as Yash Vardhan
Saif Ali Khan as Raja / Raju (dual role)
Kajol as Rani / Reshma
Laxmikant Berde as Laxmi
Aruna Irani as Dai Maa
Kader Khan as Raju's Chacha
Satyendra Kapoor as Reshma's father
Tej Sapru as Banwari

Production
The film was shot  in Ooty.

Soundtrack

References

External links
 

1997 films
1990s Hindi-language films
Films scored by Anu Malik
Films about reincarnation
Films directed by Sanjay Gupta